The "Fonoti" name is a Fa'amatai title attached to the island/village of Aunu'u, American Samoa (Tutuila) also known as the (Fonoma'aitu) family (Aiga O Sa-Faleala). The family/title comes from an ancient King Fonoti Nofoatolu Muagutut'ia Laufeti'iti'i from Lotofaga, Upolu in the early 1800s.

Also relates to the Va'a o Fonoti district in Upolu.

Society of American Samoa
Samoan culture